Gérard DuBois (born 1968) is a French illustrator. In 2017, he received the Hamilton King Award.  DuBois works in a variety of styles, which have been described as a consistent and remarkable blend of beauty, passion, and intelligence.

Early life and education
DuBois, an only child, grew up in Argenteuil, a suburban town north of Paris. No member of his family was artistic. The idea of art as a career option was introduced to DuBois at age fourteen, when the headmistress of his public school, having become aware of his drawings in notebooks, encouraged him to apply for advanced study at an art school in Paris. DuBois passed the aptitude tests required for admission and entered the school, a century-old institute in St. Germain des Prés, known to most as Rue Madame. Upon completion of his studies at Rue Madame, he enrolled for an advanced degree at École Supérieure des Arts Estienne, also in Paris. After completing his studies at École Estienne, and obliged to serve France for two years, in 1989 he would arrive in the Maritime provinces of Canada to serve as a graphic designer for the French Ministry of Cooperation where he worked at various magazines in Petit Rocher, New Brunswick, Yarmouth, Nova Scotia, Caraquet, New Brunswick and Summerside, Prince Edward Island.

Illustration career
DuBois would receive his first freelance illustration assignment after moving to Montreal in 1991 at the age of 23. The assignment would come from  Jocelyne Fournel at Montreal Magazine. Fournel would go on to hire DuBois at other publications such as L'Actualité.

Although primarily noted for his extensive work as a book illustrator, his work has also appeared in The New York Times, The Wall Street Journal, Time magazine, GQ, Rolling Stone, The New Yorker, The Washington Post, Le Monde, The Guardian, Playboy, Newsweek, Entertainment Weekly, Harper's, The Atlantic and others. DuBois also illustrated an ongoing column for Time magazine by the editor Nancy Gibbs. as well as a weekly column called Gray Matter, a weekly opinion column for The New York Times Sunday Review by Mark R. Rank and Thomas A. Hirschl.

In April 2018, Canada Post released the Gérard DuBois stamp as one of five in the Great Canadian Illustrators series. The illustration selected for the stamp was titled It's Not a Stream of Consciousness and was originally published by The New York Times, in a Gray Matter opinion column under the same title by Gregory Hickok, May 8, 2015.

Bibliography

Written and illustrated by the artist
Enfantillages, published by Rouergue, 2015
Henri au jardin d’enfants (Henri in kindergarten), published by Seuil, 2008

Illustrated by the artist

Jamais l'un.e sans l'autre: Les célèbres duos de la littérature (Never one without the other: famous duets of literature), by Sophie Bliman, published by ACTES SUD, 2020

RAGE by Orianne Charpentier, published by Gallimard Jeunesse, 2020

J'aimerais by Stéphanie Demasse-Pottier, 2019

Italian Folktales, (two volumes) The Folio Society,2019

The Amazing Collection of Joey Cornell, by Candace Fleming, published by Penguin Random House,2018

Frankenstein, by Mary Shelley, published by Gallimard Jeunesse, 2018

Voici Colin (Here is Colin) with Christiane Duchesne, published by  Lievredema 2018

Renard Sans le Corbeau by Pascale Petit, published by Notari, 2018

La Petite Ecuyère, by Charlotte Gingras, published by Les Editions Grasset, 2018

La case de l'oncle Tom (Uncle Tom's Cabin) by Harriet Beecher-Stowe, published by Gallimard Jeunesse, 2017

On aurait dit (Let's Pretend) by André Marois, published by  Seuil Jeunesse, 2016

Dorothea's Eyes: Dorothea Lange Photographs the Truth by Barb Rosenstock, published by Calkins Creek, 2016

Au-delà de la forêt (Beyond The Forest) by Nadine Robert, published by COMMEGÉANT, 2016

Un verger dans le ventre (an orchard in the belly) by Simon Boulerice, published by La courte échelle, 2013

Révélations photographiques by Louise Bombardier, published by Les éditions du passage, 2013

Arlequin, Charlot, Guignol & cie, by Bénédicte Riviere, published by ACTESSUD 2013

Monsieur Marceau: Actor Without Words by Leda Schubert, published by Flash Point, 2012

Vivre à Deux (Two's Company) by Jonathan Franzen, published by Alto, 2011

Petits Fantômes Mélancoliques by Louise Bombardier published by 400 coups, 2008

Darwin, by Elisabeth Laureau-Daull, published by Seuil Jeunesse, 2007

Les aventures illustrées de Minette Accentiévitch (The Illustrated Adventures of Minette Accentiévitch)  by Vladan Matijevic, published by Les Allusifs, 2007

Stories for Young People: Edgar Allan Poe, edited by Andrew Delbanco, published by Sterling Publishing, 2006

Le piano muet (The Silent Piano) by Gilles Vigneault, published by Les Editions Fides, 2002

Riquet à la Houppe (Riquet with the Tuft) by  André Marois, adapted by Charles Perrault, published by 400 coups, 2000

As an educator
DuBois teaches at the Université du Québec à Montréal (UQAM).

Awards

For illustration
In 2017 DuBois would win the Hamilton King Award from The Society of Illustrators, for Constructing the Modern Mind, art directed by Patricia Nemoto and Bernard Lee, at Scientific American

Silver Medal for What Would You Do? published by Brown Alumni Magazine, Case Circle of Excellence award, 2018

Gold Medal, for A sex life for priests?, art directed by Jocelyne Fournel at L'actualité, National Magazine Awards, 2017

Gold Medal for Giant milk brick, art directed by Mélanie Baillairgé at BBDO Montreal, Society of Illustrators, 2012

Gold Medal for Sacred Space, art directed by Emily Crawford and Andree Kahlmorgan at Time magazine, Society of Illustrators, 2011

Silver Medal for Digging For Dollars, art directed by Ted Keller at GreenSource Magazine, Society of Publication Designers, 2011

Gold Medal for NetworkerCover, art directed by Caren Rosenblatt, Society of Illustrators, 2009
Silver Medal, Society of Illustrators, 2006
Gold Medal, Society of Illustrators, 2005
Silver Medal, Society of Illustrators, 2004
2021 Governor General's Award for French-language children's illustration - A qui appartiennent les nuages? (with Mario Brassard)

For books
The Amelia Bloomer Book List, for Dorothea’s Eyes with Barbara Rosenstock, American Library Association, 2017

Special Mention, Bologna Ragazzi Award for Enfantillages, 2016

Norman A. Sugarman Children’s Biography Award for Monsieur Marceau with Leda Schubert, 2014

Orbis Pictus Award for Monsieur Marceau with Leda Schubert, 2013

Personal life
DuBois lives in Montreal with his wife Stephanie. The couple have had two children, Thomas and Nathan.

References

External links

Additional collection of the artist's work

1968 births
Living people
French painters
French illustrators
French male artists
French emigrants to Canada
Canadian painters
Canadian illustrators
Canadian male artists
Governor General's Award-winning children's illustrators